Mieczysław Gocuł (born 21 May 1963) is a Polish General who served as Chief of General Staff of the Polish Armed Forces from May, 7 2013 until January, 31, 2017.

Medals and decorations
Order of Polonia Restituta
Silver Cross of Merit
Iraq Star
Medal of the Armed Forces in the Service of the Fatherland
Medal of Merit for National Defence
Multinational Division Central-South Commemorative Medal
Order of the Cross of the Eagle 1st Class (Estonia)

Gallery

1963 births
Living people
Polish generals
Recipients of the Military Order of the Cross of the Eagle, Class I
Military personnel of the Iraq War
People from Choszczno County